The Arcadian Serenaders, named Original Crescent City Jazzers before, were a band of white musicians from New Orleans during the 1920s. They performed in the Arcadian Ballroom in St. Louis.

The band's members were 
 Sterling Bose (cornet)
 Felix Guarino (drums),
 Slim Hall (banjo),
 Chick Harvey (vocals),
 Cliff Holman (clarinet, alto saxophone),
 Marty Livingston (vocals),
 Avery Loposer (trombone, vocals), 
 Wingy Manone (cornet)
 Bob Marvin (banjo) and 
 Johnny Riddick (piano).

Discography

Compilations

 Arcadian Serenaders: The Complete Sets. 1924-1925, 2001

External links
 Arcadian Serenaders

American jazz ensembles from New Orleans
Musical groups established in the 1920s